Drepanocladus is a genus of mosses belonging to the family Amblystegiaceae. It has a cosmopolitan distribution

Species
The following species are recognised in the genus Drepanocladus:
 
Drepanocladus aduncus 
Drepanocladus andinus 
Drepanocladus angustifolius 
Drepanocladus apiculatus 
Drepanocladus arcticus 
Drepanocladus arnellii 
Drepanocladus asturicus 
Drepanocladus austroaduncus 
Drepanocladus austrofluitans 
Drepanocladus brachiatus 
Drepanocladus brevifolius 
Drepanocladus brevinervis 
Drepanocladus brotheri 
Drepanocladus capillifolius 
Drepanocladus contiguus 
Drepanocladus falcifolius 
Drepanocladus flageyi 
Drepanocladus fontinaloides 
Drepanocladus fuegianus 
Drepanocladus furcatus 
Drepanocladus gigas 
Drepanocladus haeringianus 
Drepanocladus hallii 
Drepanocladus hamifolius 
Drepanocladus hercynicus 
Drepanocladus hollosianus 
Drepanocladus hyperboreus 
Drepanocladus jacuticus 
Drepanocladus jamesii-macounii 
Drepanocladus kurilensis 
Drepanocladus latinervis 
Drepanocladus longifolius 
Drepanocladus lycopodioides 
Drepanocladus minnesotensis 
Drepanocladus perplicatus 
Drepanocladus polygamus 
Drepanocladus secundifolius 
Drepanocladus sendtneri 
Drepanocladus sinensiuncinatus 
Drepanocladus sordidus 
Drepanocladus sparsus 
Drepanocladus stagnatus 
Drepanocladus subjulaceus 
Drepanocladus subpiliger 
Drepanocladus symmetricus 
Drepanocladus trifarius 
Drepanocladus turgescens

References

Amblystegiaceae
Moss genera